Ken Scott (born in 1970 in Dalhousie, New Brunswick, Canada) is a Canadian screenwriter, actor, director, and comedian. He is best known as a member of the comedy group Les Bizarroïdes with Martin Petit, Stéphane E. Roy and Guy Lévesque, and as screenwriter of the films Seducing Doctor Lewis, The Little Book of Revenge (Guide de la petite vengeance), and Starbuck, as well as television series Le Plateau.

Life and career 
Scott gained a degree in cinematography at the Université du Québec à Montréal in 1991. His first widely seen work was a series of commercials for cheese made between 1995 and 1998. In 2000, he played the theatrical role of Monsieur Pearson in the play Propagande, written by Stéphane E. Roy. In 2002, he wrote episodes for the television series Le Plateau, in which he also played the role of François Chamberland.

In 2008, Scott produced his first feature film, Sticky Fingers, which he also wrote. It has been announced he will direct the film adaption of the Stephen King novel From a Buick 8 into a movie.

Filmography

Awards
Scott won the Audience Award at the 2004 Sundance Film Festival for Seducing Doctor Lewis. He has been nominated for the Quebec film industry's Prix Jutra and the national Genie Awards four times each; at both ceremonies, Scott and Petit won the 2012 awards for Best Original Screenplay for Starbuck.

References

External links

Best Screenplay Genie and Canadian Screen Award winners
Living people
1970 births
Canadian male screenwriters
Université du Québec à Montréal alumni
Film directors from Quebec
21st-century Canadian screenwriters
21st-century Canadian male writers